William Ryan DeGraffenried Sr. (April 15, 1925 – February 10, 1966) was an American attorney and politician from Alabama.

Early life 
Born and raised in Tuscaloosa, Alabama, he was the son of Edward deGraffenried, former U.S. congressman from Alabama.

Career 
DeGraffenried ran for Governor of Alabama on two occasions (1962 and 1966). On his first attempt, he was defeated in the Democratic primary runoff by George Wallace, who was later elected Governor.

In 1966, DeGraffenried ran again as a moderate, supporting racial integration. He sought to succeed the Dixiecrat-style Wallace, who was prohibited by the constitution from running for a second consecutive term. Wallace offered his wife, Lurleen Wallace, as a surrogate candidate for governor instead. One day after qualifying for the gubernatorial race, DeGraffenried died in a plane crash while campaigning in northeast Alabama near Fort Payne. Mrs. Wallace won the nomination and gubernatorial election.

Personal life 
DeGraffenried married Margaret Nell Maxwell in July 1945.

His son, Ryan DeGraffenried Jr. (1950–2006), became a notable Alabama politician. He served as State Senator, Senate president pro tempore and Lieutenant Governor of Alabama under Jim Folsom Jr. (1993–1995).

References 

Our Campaigns - Candidate - Ryan de Graffenried

1925 births
1966 deaths
Politicians from Tuscaloosa, Alabama
Accidental deaths in Alabama
Democratic Party members of the Alabama House of Representatives
20th-century American politicians
Victims of aviation accidents or incidents in 1966
Victims of aviation accidents or incidents in the United States
Ryan Sr.